Santiago González and Travis Rettenmaier were the defending champions and did not participate this year.
Another Mexican-American pair: Daniel Garza and Eric Nunez won in the final of this year's edition. They defeated Alejandro González and Carlos Salamanca 7–5, 6–4 in the final.

Seeds

Draw

Draw

External links
 Main Draw

Cerveza Club Premium Open - Doubles
2010 Doubles